Fred Seibert  is an American television producer, co-founder of MTV and the CEO of FredFilms, an animation production company based in Burbank, California. His official biography states he has led five (working) lives. He has held leading positions with MTV Networks, Hanna-Barbera, Next New Networks, and(founded)  Frederator Studios and Networks. Seibert is an angel investor in several technology and media start-ups, has produced live action and animated programs for cable television and the internet, and began his professional career as a jazz and blues record producer. Seibert's work has been honored in numerous fields. In music production his production has been nominated for a Grammy Award, he has received an AIGA Medal for lifetime exceptional achievements, he is a member of the Animation Magazine Hall of Fame and has been awarded several Annie Awards and Emmy Awards for his television productions.

Animated cartoons 
In his time working in cartoons at three studios, Seibert has helped jumpstart the creator careers of over 100 animated filmmakers, including people like Genndy Tartakovsky, Pendleton Ward, Butch Hartman, Kevin Kolde, Craig McCracken, David Feiss, Van Partible, John Dilworth, Larry Huber, Rob Renzetti, Eric Robles, Breehn Burns, Bill Burnett, Elyse Castro, Mike Rosenthal, James Kochalka, Bob Boyle, Warren Ellis and Natasha Allegri.

From 1992 until 1996, as the last president of the Hanna-Barbera cartoon studio, Seibert was able to reinvigorate the company's creative reputation with the establishment of the animation incubator What a Cartoon!. Modeled on the Golden Age of mid-20th century cartoons, the 48 short films from creators around the world, Hanna-Barbera was able to launch seven hit series after a dry spell since the launch of The Smurfs in 1981 for NBC. The shows included Genndy Tartakovsky's Dexter's Laboratory, David Feiss' Cow and Chicken and I Am Weasel, Van Partible's Johnny Bravo, John R. Dilworth's Courage the Cowardly Dog, and Craig McCracken's The Powerpuff Girls.

After Ted Turner included Hanna-Barbera in Turner Broadcasting's 1996 sale to Time Warner, Seibert established Frederator Studios as an independent animation producer based in Burbank, California.

Frederator has established itself as a major American independent with several series on Nickelodeon (like Rob Renzetti's My Life as a Teenage Robot), Cartoon Network (Pendleton Ward's Adventure Time), and Cartoon Hangover (Pendleton Ward's Bravest Warriors, Natasha Allegri's Bee and PuppyCat), and Kevin Kolde's production of Castlevania for Netflix.

Seibert created 250 short cartoons between 1995 and 2018 at Hanna-Barbera, Frederator Studios, 19 of which were continued as series at Cartoon Network, Nickelodeon, Cartoon Hangover, Netflix and YouTube.

Seibert has also created several Internet channels featuring cartoons, including Channel Frederator, Cartoon Hangover, and Next New Networks.

After starting Frederator Studios in 1997, Seibert brought together a group of investors in a failed attempt to save the troubled underground/alternative comics publisher Kitchen Sink Press.

Seibert's production of the first season of Natasha Allegri's Bee and PuppyCat for his Cartoon Hangover streaming channel was the most backed animated project on Kickstarter for several years. Season 2 was accidentally leaked onto Seibert's Vimeo channel in early 2020, but was eventually announced to be officially dropped on Netflix sometime in 2022.

Seibert stepped down from his position as CEO of Frederator in August 2020, though the company indicated that he would remain executive producer for current projects, including Bee & PuppyCat and Castlevania.

On February 23, 2022, Seibert announced the formation of cartoon production company FredFilms, with a first look deal at VIS Kids. The company is in various stages of production on five reboots of vintage Seibert productions, including a live-action The Fairly OddParents for Paramount+ and a CG animated version for Netflix. The company is developing several adult and children's original animated properties, furthering Seibert's philosophy of creators first, always original, and producing your next favorite cartoon.

Streaming Video and Internet 
In March 1999, MTV Networks CEO Tom Freston tapped Seibert to become the first president of the new MTV Networks Online, soon to split into MTV Interactive (The MTVi Group) and Nick.com.

Building on this new media success, in 2007 Seibert conceived and founded Next New Networks (with Emil Rensing, Herb Scannell, Tim Shey, and Jed Simmons), the leading online television company, with over 2 billion all time video views and as of 2010 over 200 million views every month, making it, along with Maker Studios, creators of the Multi-channel networks. Along with their affiliated Indy Mogul, Barely Political, Channel Frederator and several other networks, the company's superdistribution allowed it to become among the most widely distributed video in the world, and to become YouTube's top professional content provider. By the end of 2010, Next New Networks had the globe's top two videos viewed on YouTube. In March 2011, Next New Networks was acquired by YouTube.

In 2004 David Karp interned at Frederator Studios at its first New York City location, and built the company's first blogging platform.  In 2007 he launched Tumblr from a rented desk at Frederator Studios' Park Avenue South offices, with chief engineer Marco Arment.  Seibert was one of Tumblr's first bloggers, an angel investor in the company, and served on its board before its acquisition.

Seibert was the original angel investor in Sawhorse Media, the company that created the Shorty Awards and MuckRack, a public relations management platform that enables organizations to connect with journalists to generate media coverage.

Seibert and his Frederator Networks partnered with John Borthwick and Betaworks; Jonathan Miller, Jason Ostheimer, Shari Redstone; and entrepreneur Yoel Flohr to form Thirty Labs in 2014, a startup studio based in New York City to develop and invest in video based technology businesses Seibert is CEO and Flohr, COO. The company shuttered in 2015.

On February 21, 2012, Fred Seibert launched Cartoon Hangover, a channel on YouTube which consists of various animated shorts and series. Cartoon Hangover gained a much larger audience with the revival of Bravest Warriors by Pendleton Ward on November 8, 2012 which originally aired as a pilot on Fred Seibert's Random! Cartoons on Nicktoons Network in 2009. In 2014, Channel Frederator was revived as a multi-channel network focused entirely on animation, signing one of YouTube's biggest animation channels, Simon's Cat. By September 2014, the network was distributing 688 channels, with over 65 million monthly views and 10.5 million subscribers, and by 2017 announced it had reached 1 billion monthly views on YouTube.

Media Branding & Cable Television 

After a late 1970s stint with media promotion innovator Dale Pon at New York's WHN Radio, Seibert began his work at Warner-Amex Satellite Entertainment in 1980.

As a co-founder of MTV: Music Television and the channel's first creative director, Seibert was responsible for a complete rethinking of how the entire television industry was able to think of themselves as “brands.” He guided his team to develop the original voice and visual identity for MTV, and went on to do the same at Nickelodeon, Nick-at-Nite (which he invented with his long time creative partner Alan Goodman), and Comedy Central.

Initially, MTV had none of the kinds of programs that were thought of as "television," only more than 160 hours (there are 168 hours in a week) of music videos that were about three minutes each, and with no set schedule that could be promoted. Seibert had to develop an alternative promotional strategy that was completely different than traditional networks. The promos and network identifications his team produced did not resemble anything TV had every seen before, focusing on an approach that subtly made a series of "promises" to viewers in the wildest and most creative ways possible. The network identifications, 10-seconds each, were based on the MTV logo he commissioned and approved, designed by the Manhattan Design collective (that included his oldest childhood friend, Frank Olinsky). The logo mutated its design hundreds, thousands of ways, sometimes within one short animated film. Some senior network executives objected to a logo that did not remain constant, but the approach ultimately prevailed. The 10-second network IDs and the promos ultimately influenced graphic design and advertising for years to come.

Within two years of launch, Seibert led the team that developed "I Want My MTV!", creative direction by his mentor Dale Pon, and it became one of the most famous advertising campaigns of the late 20th century.

In 1983, with partner Alan Goodman, Seibert founded Fred/Alan Inc. in New York City as the world's first media branding company. Goodman had been one of his key creative lieutenants at MTV, and they had worked together in college radio a decade before. Together, they successfully adapted the MTV branding and promotional strategy to overhaul the then-floundering children's cable channel Nickelodeon between June 1984 and January 1985, moving it from worst to first in the ratings in six months, and continued overseeing network branding and promotion for eight more years.

By the end of 1985, at the request of Nickelodeon president Geraldine Laybourne Seibert and Goodman conceived a radical rethinking of television networks by creating Nick-at-Nite, pitched as "the first oldies TV network."  Over the nine years of the company's existence they also did extensive work with The Movie Channel, Lifetime, Showtime and Comedy Central.

Seibert continued involvement with the cable TV industry for several years. He was employed by Turner Broadcasting as the last president of Hanna-Barbera Cartoons, then as a consultant for almost 15 years at Warner-Amex successor MTV Networks, and as a producer of several animated series for Nickelodeon and Cartoon Network.

Jazz & Blues Record Producer 
Seibert began his media career in college radio at Columbia University's WKCR-FM in 1969. He says he spent most of his college career at the radio station headquarters rather than going to classes, and he never graduated.

While at Columbia he started his first company, Oblivion Records, with partners Tom Pomposello and Dick Pennington, releasing LPs by Mississippi Fred McDowell (Live in New York) and Joe Lee Wilson. Simultaneously, he produced several dozen jazz and blues albums for independent companies such as Muse Records, JCOA Records, and Birth Records (owned by instrumentalist/composer Gunter Hampel). Seibert was an early employee of New Music Distribution Service, a non-profit distributor of musician-owned record company started by composers Carla Bley and Michael Mantler, before going on the road with Bley's big band as sound engineer and road manager. Seibert announced the revival of Oblivion Records in 2021 for a digital release of a historic concert recording of jazz innovator Cecil Taylor.

Filmography 
 Fred Seibert cartoon shorts filmography

References

External links 
 
 "Fred Seibert foresees 'next golden age of animation' on Internet" Los Angeles Times, December 18, 2013 interview (2013)
 "The Story of Kids TV Mastermind Fred Seibert: Cultivating a whole new generation of weird in animation" Adweek interview (2013)
 Animation World News interview (2003)
 2000 AIGA MEDAL  by Steven Heller at AIGA.org (American Institute of Graphic Arts)
 Fred Seibert's Frederator Tumblr
 Fred Seibert dot Com
 The Fred/Alan Archive

AIGA medalists
Living people
Frederator Studios
American television producers
Hanna-Barbera people
Nickelodeon Animation Studio people
Cartoon Network Studios people
Creative directors
Showrunners
Columbia College (New York) alumni
Primetime Emmy Award winners
Year of birth missing (living people)